Nagram is a town in Lucknow district, Uttar Pradesh, India. It is located between the two roads from Lucknow to Sultanpur and Raebareli. Raja Nal Pasi was the founder of Nagram. 

Nagram's contemporary culture is the result of the amalgamation of the Hindu and Muslim rulers who ruled the town simultaneously and upheld the secular and syncretic traditions of the Nawabs of Awadh.

Geography
It is situated 37 km from Lucknow, the state capital of Uttar Pradesh.

Climate 

Nagram has a humid subtropical climate with cool, dry winters from mid-November to February and dry, hot summers with sunshine from March to mid-May and thunderstorms from late March to June. Fog is quite common from mid-December to mid February.

Occasionally, Nagram experiences colder winter spells than places like Raebareli and Lucknow. In the extraordinary winter cold spell of 2012–13, Nagram recorded temperatures below freezing point on two consecutive days and the minimum temperature hovered around freezing point for over a week. Summers are very hot with temperatures rising into the 42 °C (104 °F) to 45 °C (113 °F) range, the average highs being in the high of 30s (degree Celsius).

History
Nagram is a well-known town in the fields of education, art, culture, social, and political awareness.

One of the earliest settlements of Rizvi is from Nagram. Rizvi Sadats migrated from Subzwar (Iran) and settled in Nagram around 410 Hijri (around 1027 AD).

Nagram has are couple of grand old buildings called Imambargahs, which are of archaeological importance: Imambargah Wajahat Hussain (popularly known as Syed-wada), located in the center of Nagram, and Imambargah Mir Fida Hussain, which displays elements of Persian architecture. Anjuman-e-Abbasiya is the oldest and existing anjuman of Nagram.

Almas Ali Rizvi, Grandson of Late Zahid Ali Rizvi, is the existing Zamindar. Mohalla Bangla is famous for its zamindars who used to live in this area in the late 1800s. There are four major Shia Community areas: Sayed-wada, Kothi, Bangla, and Phulwari. Kothi belongs to Rais Mir Fida Hussain, who was a prominent figured advocate and reformer who spent his life in developing the Shia beliefs, constructing mosques, shrines, and other holy sites in the region. In 19th century, with the advent of British imperialism, he was bestowed with princely and royal title of Rais. Imambargah Kothi, built by Mir Fida Hussain, is a beautiful example of Mughlai and Turkish style architecture in India. However, the zamindari system was mostly abolished in independent India soon after its creation with the first amendment to the Constitution of India. After the independence of India, Mir Fida Hussain also institutionalized and streamlined the activities of Anjuman-e-Abbasiya and was instrumental in making it financially strong. Muharram is observed here with great fervour and great enthusiasm.

The significant importance attached to the event of death of Imam Hussain and consequently Muharram has shaped the cultural evolution of Nagram. Major religious activities of Azadari start on the first night of the month of Muharram and last two months and eight days. One of the important contributions of Muharram is that during this period, Syed families return to Nagram from throughout India to pay homage to the supreme scarifies of Imam Hussain.

The town culture originated in the Awadh region. Many people migrated from town after the Partition of India. People from Nagram usually used "Nagrami" as the title name.

Economy 
As of 1971, the economy of Nagram was dominated by primary activities. The main items imported were cloth, sugar, and cotton. The main items manufactured were shoes, handloom cloth, and beedies. The biggest exports were grains, vegetables, and tobacco.

Transport 
The nearest railway station to Nagram is on the Indian Railways network in Nigoha. The bus station is at Lucknow–Raebareli road.

Schools and colleges 

 Girls Degree College
 Nagram Primary School
 Madarsa Afzalul Uloom
 RNJ Inter College
 Chaudhary Ram Adhar Santbaksh Inter College

Demographics
, Nagram had a population of 9,218. Males constitute 51% of the population and females 49%. Nagram has an average literacy rate of 43%, lower than the national average of 59.5%: male literacy is 53%, and female literacy is 33%. In Nagram, 17% of the population is under 6 years of age.

References

Cities and towns in Lucknow district